Mordkhe Veynger (1890–1929), more infrequently known as Mikhail Borisovich Veynger was a Russian and Soviet linguist. An ethnic Jew, he specialised in the study of the Yiddish language.

Born in Poltava, Russian Empire (now in Ukraine), his family moved to Warsaw when he was a child, where he studied Germanic philology at the Imperial University of Warsaw. After World War I he established himself at Minsk where he became lecturer at the Belarusian State University.

He began the first Yiddish dialect atlas in the 1920s. The atlas is limited to phonology and to Yiddish spoken within the territory of the Soviet Union in 1931.

References 

Language geography
University of Warsaw alumni
Linguists from the Soviet Union
20th-century linguists
Linguists of Yiddish
1890 births
1929 deaths
Soviet Jews
Academic staff of Belarusian State University
1929 suicides